Number One Hits may refer to:

Number One Hits (Tim McGraw album)
Number One Hits The Bellamy Brothers album
Number One Hits (The Judds album)
Number One Hits Eddie Rabbitt album
Number One Hits Elvis Presley album